Méry Laurent, born Anne Rose Suzanne Louviot (born 29 April 1849, Nancy- d. 26 November 1900), was a demi-mondaine (courtesan) and the muse of several Parisian artists. She used to run her own “salon” where she hosted many French (and even American) writers and painters of her time: Stéphane Mallarmé, Émile Zola, Marcel Proust, François Coppée, Henri Gervex, James Whistler, and Édouard Manet.

Biography 
Anne Rose Suzanne Louviot was born in Nancy in 1849. She was the daughter of a woman who worked as a laundress in Marshal Francois Certain De Canrobert's household, and of an unknown father. Her laundress mother sold her 15-year-old daughter's virginity to Canrobert, so that her daughter would become Canorbert's mistress and receive an annuity for life of 500 francs per month. When she turned 16, this enabled her to go in Paris, where she started a brief career as an actress.  She played light comedies at The Théâtre des Variétés; the role of her lifetime there was the Venus Anadyomene, posing naked on her shell; at the Théâtre du Châtelet, she also played Offenbach's féeries.

In 1874, after becoming a high-class prostitute, she met Thomas W. Evans, an extremely wealthy American dental surgeon who tended to many high-profile people, and even royal families. He made her his mistress and helped her settle down at 52, rue de Rome, where she held her “salon”, hosting all of the Parisian artistic avant-garde. Through this occasion, she became the mistress of Francois Coppée, Stéphane Mallarmé, Antonin Proust, as well as Edouard Manet's mistress and model.

When Laurent died, she bequeathed her wealth to Victor Margueritte, her last favorite and "protégé", with the exception of her allegoric portrait of Autumn (a painting by Manet, begun in 1882), which went to the Museum of Fine Arts of Nancy.

Laurent was buried in the Père-Lachaise cemetery (56th section).

Her "Salon" 

The "salon" she ran was a place of exchanges which boosted the creative steps of those who patronized it: one could find there Edouard Manet and Henri Gervex, but also poets and writers such as Stéphane Mallarmé, François Coppée, Joris-Karl Huysmans, Marcel Proust (the author painted Méry Laurent's portrait through Odette de Crécy's character in "Swann in Love",) or even Zola (who based his 1880 novel Nana on Méry Laurent). She also received sculptors, lyrical artists and musicians, such as Hortense Schneider and Reynaldo Hahn. Hahn would go on to become her testamentary executor.

Her portraits by Edouard Manet

References

Further reading 
 Francoise Cachin, Manet, 1832–1883, The Metropolitan Museum Of Art, New York 1983,

External links 
 
 WorldCat

French courtesans
1849 births
1900 deaths
French salon-holders
Muses